The 2008 Rushmoor Council election took place on 1 May 2008 to elect members of Rushmoor Borough Council in Hampshire, England. One third of the council was up for election and the Conservative Party stayed in overall control of the council.

After the election, the composition of the council was:
Conservative 29
Liberal Democrat 8
Labour 5

Campaign
Before the election the Conservatives held 26 seats, the Liberal Democrats 7, Labour 6 and a further 3 vacant. 15 seats were up for election with 2 seats in St Johns ward being contested after the death of Conservative councillor Graham Tucker. The other 2 vacant seats were in Cove and Southwood, and Empress wards, where Liberal Democrat and Conservative councillors respectively stood down at the election.

50 candidates were standing including 4 from the British National Party and 1 from the Official Monster Raving Loony Party as well as candidates from the Conservatives, Liberal Democrats and Labour parties. The candidates included a 19-year-old Conservative in Heron Wood ward who was hoping to become the youngest ever councillor in Rushmoor.

Issues in the election included local developments, an increase in flights at Farnborough Airfield, the recent trial of alternate weekly rubbish collection, anti-social behaviour, spending cuts and councillors' expenses.

Election result
The results saw the Conservatives stay in control of the council with 29 seats compared to 8 for the Liberal Democrats and 5 Labour. The Conservatives gained two seats from the Liberal Democrats in Cove and Southwood and West Heath wards to increase their majority. However the Liberal Democrats did take one seat back in St Marks ward defeating the Conservative councillor for the previous 10 years Nigel Baines. Meanwhile, in Heron Wood ward the Liberal Democrats 
gained a seat in Aldershot for the first time since 2006 after defeating the sitting Labour councillor. Labour easily held their only other seat in North Town, while narrowly failed to gain Wellington from the Conservatives by 50 votes; however Labour came last in all 9 wards in Farnborough.

Overall turnout was down from the 2007 election at 33.7% with the lowest turnout in Wellington ward at 19.8%. Following the election the Liberal Democrats elected a new group leader with Sue Gadsby taking over from Craig Card who had been party leader for the previous 9 years.

Ward results

References

2008
2008 English local elections
2000s in Hampshire